Pericle Fazzini (4 May 1913 – 4 December 1987) was an Italian painter and sculptor. His large work, La Resurrezione, is installed in the Aula Paolo VI in the Vatican City in Rome.

Life 

Fazzini was born on 4 May 1913 at Grottammare, in the province of Ascoli Piceno in the Marche, to Vittorio Fazzini and Maria Alessandrini. As a boy he worked with his brothers in the family carpentry workshop, where he learned to carve wood. In 1930, with the help of the poet Mario Rivosecchi, he moved to Rome to study at the Scuola libera del nudo.

In 1931, he won a competition in Catania to design a monument to cardinal Dusmet; it was never made. In 1932 he took part in a competition for the Pensionato Artistico Nazionale of the Ministero della Pubblica Istruzione, the Italian ministry of arts and education, and with his low-relief Uscita dall'arca ("leaving the ark") won a two-year bursary.

He died in Rome on 4 December 1987.

Works 

 Monument to Padre Pio, Piazza Padre Pio, San Giovanni Rotondo (FG)
 Resurrezione, Paul VI Audience Hall, Vatican;
 Tabernacolo, Villa Nazareth, Rome
 Monumento alla Resistenza, Ancona

References 

1913 births
1987 deaths
20th-century Italian sculptors
20th-century Italian male artists
Italian male sculptors
20th-century Italian painters
Italian male painters
People from the Province of Ascoli Piceno